The St. Tsar Lazar Guard, commonly known as Tsar Lazar Guard (Гарда цара Лазара) was an ultra-nationalistic organization led by Hadži Andrej Milić and Željko Vasiljević. It was formed by the Movement of Veterans of Serbia to fight against Kosovo independence from Serbia. It is named after Prince Lazar of Serbia, who died in the Battle of Kosovo.

On 5 May 2007, the National Serbian Movement hosted a Serbian Assembly in the Lazarica Church in Kruševac where it swore in "the Saint Tsar Lazar Guard vowed to free Kosovo and Metohija." Vasiljević stated it would be "the establishment of a first uniformed Christian militia squad,  war veterans from all over Serbia." Serbian police detained 27 people at the event.

On 28 June 2007, the Guard took part in the Battle of Kosovo commemoration organized by the Serbian government. UN officials reacted strongly to the Guard's presence, and international officials claimed that it was provocation and attempt to destabilize the situation.

The United Nations Interim Administration Mission in Kosovo (UNMIK) has prohibited the organization from entering Kosovo and deemed it illegal. It is considered a group of Serbian ultra-nationalists who utilize rhetorical statements that promote that Albanians be killed or expelled and opposing Serbs to be "dealt with".

In mid-November 2007, the group said that war in Kosovo was inevitable, with Milić saying that "Just as Martić shelled Zagreb, we will do the same to Priština. Since the Šiptars have reproduced like rabbits, they will die like rabbits. There will be no survivors. God help the Serbian military and police if they try and get in our way. We will view them as the enemy, and we will do to them the same as we'll do to the Šiptars." In late November, he was detained by Serbian police, but later released.

On 23 February 2008, the organization claimed responsibility for the burning of the border post at Rudnica.

Milić was arrested on 9 September 2010, after threats against the year's Pride parade. He claimed that he suffered a heart attack while imprisoned in Belgrade.

References

Defunct political organizations in Serbia
Far-right politics in Serbia
Serbian nationalism
Nationalist organizations
Organizations established in 2007
Organizations disestablished in 2010
2007 establishments in Serbia
2010 disestablishments in Serbia